Beefeater was an American post-hardcore band from late 1984 until late 1986. Along with Embrace and Rites of Spring, they were one of the mainstay acts of the 1985 Revolution Summer movement which took place within the Washington, D.C. hardcore punk scene. They were pioneers of the post-hardcore genre in the mid-1980s with bands like Embrace, Rites of Spring and Gray Matter, among others.

History
Beefeater was formed by Tomas Squip, Fred "Freak" Smith, Dug E. Bird (Birdzell) and Bruce Atchley Taylor. Their debut LP, Plays for Lovers, was released in 1985 on Dischord Records, their follow-up was the six-song 1986 Need a Job EP, whereas their second record on Dischord, House Burning Down, was posthumously released in 1987 as their farewell album. Both band's Dischord releases would be combined on the 1992 compilation CD Plays For Lovers & House Burning Down, with two bonus tracks.

For Beefeater's second record, drummer Bruce Taylor was replaced by Mark "Two-Chair" Shellhaas, who in turn, would be substituted by Kenny Craun for the band's final album. After the breakup of Beefeater, Squip and Birdzell went on to form Fidelity Jones, while Craun joined the Rhythm Pigs, and Fred "Freak" Smith joined Strange Boutique.

While Beefeater's songs had all the angry energy of its hardcore labelmates the energy was channelled as much through funk and jazz as rock and roll. Dug E. Bird's fast-paced bass slap drives a rhythm section over which Fred "Not Sonic" Smith's guitar rides in a way reminiscent of the Minutemen.  House Burning Down saw the incorporation of even more non-punk influences, most notably world music and included musical cameos many of the Dischord Records regulars (Ian MacKaye provides an intro to the album, in addition to some saxophone).

Squip's essay in Threat by Example: A Documentation of Inspiration (Martin Sprouse, editor, 1991 Pressure Drop Press: San Francisco) outlines his notably religious world view and motivation, unusual for a Dischord band.

Discography
 Plays for Lovers 1985 Dischord Records (catalog No. 17) Bruce Atchley Taylor plays drums.
 Need a Job 1986 Olive Tree Records (catalog No. 106) Mark Shellhaas plays drums.
 House Burning Down 1987 Dischord Records (catalog No. 23) Kenny Craun plays drums.

See also
 Revolution Summer

References

External links

 Interview with Tomas Squip (now known as Onam Emmet)
 Interview with Dug E. Bird
 Onam Emmet (formerly Tomas Squip) speak about Positive Force shows

Punk rock groups from Washington, D.C.
American post-hardcore musical groups
Dischord Records artists
First-wave emo bands
American emo musical groups